Berkeley Crescent is a late 18th-century crescent of six Georgian houses with a private communal garden.

History 
It was designed by Thomas Paty (1713-1789) in 1787 and completed in c. 1800, possibly by his son, William Paty (1758-1800). It was originally intended to be part of Berkeley Square. In the 14th Century, the site was known as Bartholomew Close.

Numbers 1–6 cover the south and east side of the crescent. The site is designated by the National Heritage List for England: Listed Building Grade II*. The houses are in the mid-Georgian style, constructed in brick with limestone dressings and a slate mansard roof. Each three-storey house has an attic and basement which has a double-depth plan. There is a raised flagged pavement with steps at each end.

Location 
The Crescent is located within the Park Street & Brandon Hill conservation area  between Berkeley Square and the Triangle in the Clifton area of Bristol. The postcode is within the Hotwells and Harbourside ward and electoral division, which is in the constituency of Bristol West.  Quarter runs serviced apartments, called Berkeley Suites at 6 Berkeley Crescent. The old Lyndale Hotel was situated at the end of the terrace at 19 Berkeley Square.

The Bristol Museum and Art Gallery, Cabot Tower in Brandon Hill Park, and the Wills Memorial Building of the University of Bristol is close by. The Crescent was formerly in the parish of St Augustine the Less and is now in the parish of St. Stephen with St. James and St. John the Baptist with St. Michael, Bristol and St. George Bristol.

Further reading 
 Conservation Area 10 Park Street and Brandon Hill Character Appraisal and Management proposals https://www.bristol.gov.uk/documents/20182/33832/park-street-and-brandon-hill-character-appraisal.pdf/e284ea0d-d1a3-48ef-8650-83a87e3cb809 
 Central, Clifton and HarboursideNeighbourhood Partnership Statistical Profile 2016. https://web.archive.org/web/20170412143133/https://www.bristol.gov.uk/documents/20182/928407/Central%2C+Clifton+and+Harbourside.pdf/cac587ce-36b5-4e35-903d-3c24ce2b3bd4

References

Grade II* listed buildings in Bristol
18th-century architecture in the United Kingdom
Streets in Bristol
Georgian architecture in Bristol
Clifton, Bristol